Vouillon is a commune in the Indre department in central France.

Population

The inhabitants of the town of Vouillon are called Vouillonnais in French.

See also
Communes of the Indre department

References

Communes of Indre